Calandrini is an Italian surname. Notable people with this surname include:

Filippo Calandrini (1403–1476), Italian Roman Catholic cardinal and half-brother of Pope Nicholas V
Jean-Louis Calandrini (1703–1758), Genevan scientist
Alline Calandrini (born 1988), commonly known as Calan, Brazilian sports journalist and former football defender 

Italian-language surnames